Kurt von Wessely, also Curt von Wessely (18 October 1881 – 25 October 1917), was an Austrian tennis player who was active during the beginning of the 20th century.

Career
In July 1905 he played for the Austrian Davis Cup team in a semifinal match against Australasia. The match was played on the grass courts at the Queen's Club, London, England and was won 5–0 by Australasia. Von Wessely lost his singles match against Tony Wilding in four sets and his match against Norman Brookes in three straight sets.

Von Wessely participated in the Wimbledon Championships in 1903 and 1907 and on both occasions lost his first round match. At the time players who were defeated in the first or second rounds of the singles competition were entitled to compete for the All England Plate. In 1907 he reached the final of that competition in which he lost in two straight sets to future four–time Wimbledon champion Anthony Wilding from New Zealand.

In 1901 and 1903 von Wessely reached the singles final at the Austrian Championship, played in Prague but on both occasions lost in straight sets to Major Ritchie. In 1909 he again reached the singles final and this time won the title, defeating compatriot Fritz Pipes in three straight sets.

In August 1904 he reached the challenge round of the German International Championships in Hamburg and was beaten once more by Ritchie, this time in straight sets. In July 1905 Von Wessely won the Franzensbad tournament, through a walkover in the final against his compatriot Rolf Kinzl, and the following Marienbad tournament. In September 1908 he won the singles title of the Championships of the Suisse Romande in Territet. In the final he defeated R. Norris Williams in three straight sets.

During World War I he became a lieutenant in the cavalry until a gunshot wound in the arm prevented further active duty. He died on 25 October 1917 in Vienna as a result of complications of this wound.

References

External links

1881 births
1917 deaths
Austrian male tennis players
Counts of Austria
Austro-Hungarian military personnel killed in World War I
Deaths by firearm in Austria